Leah Rabin (née Schloßberg; 8 April 1928 – 12 November 2000) was the wife of Israeli Prime Minister Yitzhak Rabin, who was assassinated in 1995.

Biography
Leah Rabin was born Leah Schloßberg in Königsberg, East Prussia, Germany (now Kaliningrad, Russia), to an upper-middle-class family of Russian-born parents. Immediately after Adolf Hitler's election as Chancellor of Germany in 1933, Schloßberg emigrated with her family to Mandate Palestine. Her father had bought a piece of property near Binyamina on his first trip to the area in 1927. She met her future husband, Yitzhak Rabin, at school. They married in 1948, the year of Israel's independence.

Yitzhak became Prime Minister in 1974 following Golda Meir's resignation. In 1975, Leah Rabin attended to the World Conference on Women as the head of Israel's representation. Princess Ashraf Pahlavi, twin sister of Iran's Shah, Imelda Marcos, wife of Philippines' president; Minister Barbara Castle, Secretary of State for Health and Social Services of Great Britain (and political guide of Margaret Thatcher); Jehan Sadat, wife of Egypt's president. So many delegations were headed by politicians that the Conference became an arena of international disputes instead of a forum about humanitarianism, social or educative issues.

When Rabin reached the podium "35 delegations abandoned the room" with hundreds of delegates from Africa, Asia, Latin America, and the Soviet bloc. Rabin had to wait for the "exodus to finish" to begin speaking. The violence against Israel made them fear that the Arab countries and other Non-Aligned Movement countries delegations questioned the credentials of Israel to participate in the Conference. Finally, the challenge turned to be only a rumor, but the Declaration of Mexico draft of 30 June already included a call to eliminate Zionism.

Later, the UN General Assembly adopted, by the impulse of Arab countries, the Soviet bloc and the Non-Aligned Movement, the 3379 resolution, which considered Zionism as racism and compared it with South Africa's Apartheid. The conformation of that group of countries followed the logic of Cold War confrontations. The bloc voting produced a majority in the UN that organized to systematically condemn Israel in resolutions such as: 3089, 3236, 32/40, among other.

Three years after Yitzhak Rabin's appointment, in 1977, a US bank account (illegal at that time in Israel) held by Leah was exposed by Haaretz journalist Dan Margalit. As a result, her husband decided to take responsibility, resigned from office. This came to be known as the Dollar Account affair.

Rabin supported the peace efforts of her husband in the Israeli–Palestinian conflict and worked further for a solution after his assassination. She wrote a book about her memories of her husband, which was released in 1997, under the name Rabin: Our Life, His Legacy.

She supported Shimon Peres in the elections of 1996, calling people to vote for him so that her husband's death "would not be in vain." She also expressed her disappointment after he lost the elections to Benjamin Netanyahu. In the election of 1999 she supported Ehud Barak. However, during Barak's term as prime minister she changed her opinions about him.

Death
Leah Rabin was diagnosed with lung cancer and died in Rabin Medical Center in Petah Tikva in 2000 at the age of 72 and was buried in Mount Herzl in Jerusalem beside her husband Yitzhak Rabin, a few days after the fifth anniversary of her husband's assassination.

Family
The Rabins' daughter, Dalia was later a Knesset member for the Centre Party, New Way and the Labour Party, serving as Deputy Minister of Defense.

References

External links

1928 births
2000 deaths
Burials at Mount Herzl
Deaths from lung cancer in Israel
People from East Prussia
People from Königsberg
Jews in Mandatory Palestine
Jewish emigrants from Nazi Germany to Mandatory Palestine
Spouses of prime ministers of Israel
Yitzhak Rabin